Scedopla umbrosa is a species of moth of the family Erebidae first described by Wileman in 1916. It is found in Taiwan.

References

Moths described in 1916
Calpinae